Villa de Hidalgo (also, Villa Hidalgo, Picacho, and Iturbide) is a village in San Luis Potosí, Mexico.

References

Populated places in San Luis Potosí